Gerard & Kelly is an American artist duo composed of Brennan Gerard (born 1978, Piqua, OH) and Ryan Kelly (born 1979, Drums, PA). The pair create works with performance, video and installation. The artists’ primary interest in is the relationship of the couple. Their work explores the impact of this structure on human, particularly queer, behavior.

Gerard received a BA in women's and gender studies from Yale University, New Haven (2001) and Kelly received a BA in comparative literature from Fordham University, Bronx, New York (2008). Both artists completed the Whitney Museum Independent Study Program (2010) and received MFAs from the Interdisciplinary Studio at the University of California, Los Angeles (UCLA) School of Art (2013).

Their work is included in the collection of the Solomon R. Guggenheim Museum, New York; LACMA, Los Angeles.

References

External links 
 Official site
 Art in America, 2016, review of Chosen Family by Wendy Vogel 
 The New York Times, 2014, review of Timelining by Holland Cotter
 Artforum, 2013, critics pick, Kiss Solo at Kate Werble gallery
 Frieze, 2016, review of Modern Living by Evan Moffitt

American artists